This is a list of most-watched Netflix original programming in total hours viewed, in the first 28 days of being uploaded to Netflix. These statistics are released by Netflix based on its proprietary engagement metrics.

Television series
Television shows on Netflix with over 500 million views in their first 28 days.

Films
Films on Netflix with over 100 million views in their first 28 days.

References

External links
 

Netflix
Netflix lists
Netflix
Netflix